William Thorpe may refer to:

William de Thorpe (died 1361), English Chief Justice
 William Thorpe, putative author of the 1407 Lollard text The Testimony of William Thorpe 
William Homan Thorpe (1902–1986), British ethologist
William Walford Thorpe (1869–1932), ethnologist of the Australian Museum
Billy Thorpe (1946–2007), English-born Australian singer-songwriter, producer, and musician

See also
Will Thorp (born 1977), actor